The Monastery of Santa María de Obarra is a monastery in Beranui, Aragon, Spain. It was established in the 9th century.

This monastery is located in the Pre-Pyrenees at the foot of the Mountains of Sis, close to the Isábena River.

External links

Santa María de Obarra - Romanicoaragones.com
Santa María de Obarra - Aldeaglobal.net

Monasteries in Aragon
9th-century establishments in Spain
Christian monasteries established in the 9th century